James Burke is former Police Chief in Suffolk County, New York. In May 2013 the FBI and the US Attorney's Office opened an investigation into alleged actions by Burke when employed as Chief of the Suffolk County Police Department: the alleged assault of a suspect in police custody, a subsequent cover-up, and coercion of witnesses. The former chief pleaded guilty to reduced charges in February 2016.

References

American police officers convicted of crimes